Vallecitos is an unincorporated community located in Rio Arriba County, New Mexico, United States.

Description
Vallecitos has a post office with ZIP code 87581.

See also

References

External links

Unincorporated communities in Rio Arriba County, New Mexico
Unincorporated communities in New Mexico